The 2007 Hard Justice was a professional wrestling pay-per-view (PPV) event produced by Total Nonstop Action Wrestling (TNA), which took place on August 12, 2007 at the Impact Zone in Orlando, Florida. It was the third event under the Hard Justice chronology. Nine matches were featured on the event's card.

In October 2017, with the launch of the Global Wrestling Network, the event became available to stream on demand. It would later be available on Impact Plus in May 2019.

Storylines
Hard Justice featured nine professional wrestling matches and two pre-show matches that involved different wrestlers from pre-existing scripted feuds and storylines. Wrestlers portrayed villains, heroes, or less distinguishable characters in the scripted events that built tension and culminated in a wrestling match or series of matches.

The show included the reintroduction of the wrestler formerly known as Goldust as Black Reign.

Results

References

2007 in professional wrestling in Florida
Professional wrestling in Orlando, Florida
Events in Orlando, Florida
August 2007 events in the United States
Hardcore Justice
2007 Total Nonstop Action Wrestling pay-per-view events